Steganthera is a genus of flowering plants belonging to the family Monimiaceae.

Its native range is Papuasia.

Species:

Steganthera alpina 
Steganthera australiana 
Steganthera chimbuensis 
Steganthera cooperorum 
Steganthera cyclopensis 
Steganthera dentata 
Steganthera fasciculata 
Steganthera hentyi 
Steganthera hirsuta 
Steganthera hospitans 
Steganthera ilicifolia 
Steganthera insculpta 
Steganthera laxiflora 
Steganthera ledermannii 
Steganthera macooraia 
Steganthera moszkowskii 
Steganthera myrtifolia 
Steganthera odontophylla 
Steganthera oligantha 
Steganthera parvifolia 
Steganthera psychotrioides 
Steganthera pycnoneura 
Steganthera royenii 
Steganthera salomonensis 
Steganthera stevensii 
Steganthera suberosoalata 
Steganthera symplocoides

References

Monimiaceae
Monimiaceae genera
Flora of Papuasia